Izatha huttonii is a moth of the family Oecophoridae. It is endemic to New Zealand, where it is known from the Wellington district of the North Island, the South Island, and Stewart Island. Although similar in appearance to related species I. huttonii can be distinguished as it has a distinctive "M" shaped mark on its forewings. The larvae feed on the dead wood of makomako and karamu. Adult moths have been collected from October to March.

Taxonomy 
This species was first described by Arthur Gardiner Butler in 1879 using a female specimen obtained in Otago by Frederick Hutton and named Oecophora huttonii. In 1888 I. huttonii was synonymised by Edward Meyrick with Izatha peroneanella. However 2014 Robert J. B. Hoare removed I. huttonii from synonymy with I. peroneanella and reinstated it as a species. The holotype specimen is held at the Natural History Museum, London.

Description 
Butler originally described the species as follows:

I. huttonii has long been confused with I. peroneanella.  The differences between these species are variable and subtle. The most obvious visual distinguishing feature of I. huttonii is its forewing discal "M" mark. This mark is complete in I. huttonii where as with I. peroneanella it usually broken beyond the first stroke. In general, although both species are variable in colouration, I. huttonii tends to be a paler green and I. peroneanella is usually a brighter lime green.

This species is polymorphic and comes in green and white shades. The green colouration can turn yellowish if the moth is wet.

A description of larvae has yet to be positively associated with this species.

Distribution 
This species is endemic to New Zealand. It is found in the south of the North Island only around Wellington, is widespread in the South Island and is the only Izatha species found on Stewart Island. I. huttonii is more common in Wellington that the similar species I. peroneanella.

Biology and behaviour 
Adults are on wing from November to March though one specimen has been captured in October.

Habitat and host species 

Larvae have been recorded feeding on dead branches of Aristotelia serrata and has been reared from Coprosma robusta. The larvae are full fed in November and pupate in the wood of their hosts without making a cocoon.

References

External links

 Type specimen held at the Natural History Museum, London

Oecophorinae
Taxa named by Arthur Gardiner Butler
Moths described in 1879
Endemic fauna of New Zealand
Moths of New Zealand
Endemic moths of New Zealand